Nine ships of the Royal Navy have been named HMS Avenger:

HMS Avenger was a sloop-of-war launched in 1778 as the 8-gun fireship . She was renamed HMS Avenger on her conversion to a sloop in 1779 and was sold in 1783.
 was a 16-gun sloop-of-war, formerly the French Vengeur. She was captured in 1794 and sold in 1802.
 was a sloop-of-war, previously the civilian vessel Elizabeth. She was purchased in 1803 and foundered later that year.
 was an 18-gun sloop-of-war, formerly the collier Thames. She was purchased in 1804 and wrecked in 1812.
 was a wooden paddle frigate launched in 1845 and wrecked off North Africa in 1847.
 was a Landing Ship, Tank launched in 1945 as LST 3011. She was renamed HMS Avenger in 1947 and was sold to the Royal Indian Navy in 1949, being renamed Magar in 1951.
 was a Type 21 frigate launched in 1975. She fought in the Falklands War, and was sold to Pakistan in 1994 and renamed .

Battle honours
Ships named Avenger have earned the following battle honours:
Martinique, 1794
North Africa, 1942
Arctic, 1942
Falkland Islands, 1982

In fiction

The Alexander Kent novel "Midshipman Bolitho and the Avenger" features a 10 gun Royal Navy Cutter named Avenger.

Royal Navy ship names

fi:HMS Avenger